Cythera is a science fiction novel by British writer Richard Calder, first published in 1998. While it is not explicitly advertised as a continuation of Calder's previous novels it does appear to be set in the same universe as his "Dead Girls" trilogy, as it references some of the background of the earlier novels and features two supporting characters - Kito and Mosquito - who were introduced in Dead Girls, though knowledge of these novels is not required to understand this stand-alone novel. Due to the timeline given the events of Cythera appear to take place before those of Dead Girls, making this a prequel of sorts.

Richard Calder has said that the inspiration for the novel came from a series of news reports that he heard on the BBC World Service whilst living in Thailand which suggested that England was gripped by hysterical fear that bands of children were committing crime and mayhem and threatening to destroy society as we know it.

Plot summary
Cythera is set in a near future Earth following an unsuccessful Third World Children's Crusade against the West, with children being subject to increasing levels of censorship.  Film-maker Flynn has been imprisoned for making the subversive Dahlia Chan films, along with his leading lady Jaruwan.  Thanks to the increasing power of the Net sentient 'ghosts' of media images have crossed from Earth 2 to Earth 1, and the novel follows the affair between human Tarquin and Dahlia Chan, their efforts to rescue Jaruwan and their ultimate quest for the freedom of mythical Cythera.

Reception
The reviewer in All Hallows the magazine of the Ghost Story Society treated the book as a modern ghost story. Earth 2 is also called fibrespace. It is the future of the Internet and individuals can be downloaded into this where they become effectively ghosts. Dhalia Chan the B movie actress lives on in fibrespace. However the real actress, called Jaruwan still exists in the real world, or Earth 1:

References

1998 British novels
British science fiction novels
Orbit Books books